Charles II may refer to :
 Charles II of France or Charles the Bald (823–877), king of the West Franks and Holy Roman Emperor
 Charles II of Naples (1254–1309)
 Charles II, Count of Alençon (1297–1346)
 Charles II of Navarre (1332–1387)
 Charles II, Duke of Lorraine (1364–1431)
 Charles II of Sweden or Charles VIII of Sweden (1409–1470)
 Charles II, Duke of Bourbon (1434–1488)
 Charles II, Duke of Guelders (1467–1538)
 Charles II, Duke of Savoy (1489–1496)
 Charles II, Count of Nevers (died 1521)
 Charles II, Margrave of Baden-Durlach (1529–1577)
 Charles II, Archduke of Inner Austria (1540–1590)
 Charles II, Count of Hohenzollern-Sigmaringen (1547–1606)
 Charles II, Lord of Monaco (1555–1589)
 Charles II, Duke of Elbeuf (1596–1657)
 Charles II, Duke of Mantua and Montferrat (1629–1665)
 Charles II of England, Scotland and Ireland (1630–1685)
 Charles II, Elector Palatine (1651–1685)
 Charles II of Spain (1661–1700)
 Charles II of Bohemia or Charles VI, Holy Roman Emperor (1685–1740)
 Charles II, Grand Duke of Mecklenburg-Strelitz (1741–1816)
 Charles II of Norway or Charles XIII of Sweden (1748–1818)
 Charles II, Duke of Parma (1799–1883)
 Charles II, Landgrave of Hesse-Philippsthal (1803–1868)
 Charles II, Duke of Brunswick (1804–1873)
 Fancy (ship), a privateer frigate originally christened Charles II

See also 
 Charles
 Charles de Secondat, baron de Montesquieu (1689–1755), French political philosopher of the Enlightenment era
 King Charles (disambiguation)